Quinate/shikimate dehydrogenase (YdiB) is an enzyme with systematic name L-quinate:NAD(P)+ 3-oxidoreductase. This enzyme catalyses the following chemical reaction

 (1) L-quinate + NAD(P)+  3-dehydroquinate + NAD(P)H + H+
 (2) shikimate + NAD(P)+  3-dehydroshikimate + NAD(P)H + H+

This is the second shikimate dehydrogenase enzyme found in Escherichia coli and differs from EC 1.1.1.25, shikimate dehydrogenase, in that it can use both quinate and shikimate as substrate, and either NAD+ or NADP+ as acceptor.

References

External links 
 

EC 1.1.1